George Street tram stop is a tram stop in Croydon, south London, served by Tramlink. It is one of the busiest stops on the line as it is the most centrally located stop for the main shopping areas. It is almost directly outside the former Allders store and is on the site of the Park Place proposed development. At this stop, trams only depart in a westbound direction.

References

Tramlink stops in the London Borough of Croydon
Railway stations in Great Britain opened in 2000